Michael Pierce (born September 1, 1980) is a retired American professional mixed martial artist. He formerly competed as a Welterweight in the UFC and also competed in a one-fight stint in the WEC.

Personal life
Pierce is married and has two children; Madison and Michael, & three stepchildren; Anthony, Alex,  and Amelia.

Background
Pierce was born and raised in Portland, Oregon, on September 1, 1980. Pierce competed in wrestling at Sam Barlow High School in Gresham, Oregon and then continued his career at Portland State University where he was a two-time All-American.

Mixed martial arts career

Ultimate Fighting Championship
Pierce defeated former WEC contender Brock Larson via unanimous decision in his UFC debut at UFC Fight Night 19.

Pierce was expected to fight Josh Koscheck on January 11, 2010 at UFC Fight Night 20.
However, Koscheck instead fought Anthony Johnson at UFC 106 and Pierce went on to face Jon Fitch on December 12, 2009 at UFC 107. After losing the first two rounds, Pierce dominated the end of the third round, nearly finishing Fitch. He lost to Fitch via unanimous decision (29-28, 29-28, 29-28).

Pierce was scheduled to face Rob Kimmons on March 21, 2010 at UFC Live: Vera vs. Jones, but Kimmons was forced off the card with an injury. Pierce instead faced UFC newcomer Julio Paulino. Pierce won the fight via unanimous decision (30-27, 30-27, 30-27).

Pierce again fought another UFC newcomer in Amilcar Alves on August 28, 2010 at UFC 118. He won the fight via submission (straight armbar) in the third round.

For the third consecutive time Pierce fought a UFC newcomer in Kenny Robertson on February 5, 2011 at UFC 126. He won the fight via TKO due to punches early into the second round.

Pierce faced Johny Hendricks on August 6, 2011 at UFC 133. Pierce lost the fight against Hendricks by split decision.

At UFC on Fox 1, on November 12, 2011, Pierce fought Paul Bradley in a rematch from their time on the regional circuit. He won the fight via split decision.

Pierce next faced Josh Koscheck on February 4, 2012 at UFC 143.  He lost the fight via split decision.

Pierce defeated Carlos Eduardo Rocha on June 8, 2012 at UFC on FX 3 by unanimous decision. After a dominant performance by Pierce, initially 2 judges scored the fight 30-27 for Pierce, while the 3rd judge inexplicably scored it 30-27 for Rocha. However, it was later announced that the judge, Ric Bays, had scored the fight for the wrong corner and he had actually won unanimously.

Pierce fought Aaron Simpson on October 5, 2012 at UFC on FX 5. After a dominant first round put in by Simpson, nearly finishing Pierce on two occasions, Pierce came back, and 29 seconds into the second round, finished Simpson via one punch KO.

Pierce faced Seth Baczynski on December 15, 2012 at UFC on FX 6, replacing an injured Kyle Noke.  He won the fight via unanimous decision.

Pierce fought David Mitchell on July 6, 2013 at UFC 162. After a close first round, Pierce won via TKO in the second round after landing a short left hook to the jaw and following up with ground and pound.

Pierce next faced Rousimar Palhares on October 9, 2013 at UFC Fight Night 29. He lost the fight via heel hook submission just 31 seconds into the first round.  However, Palhares continued cranking the heel hook even after Pierce tapped out and the referee stepped in, leading the UFC to cut ties with Palhares the next day. Pierce suffered a sprained MCL and a torn ankle ligament.

Pierce was expected to face Demian Maia on May 31, 2014 at The Ultimate Fighter Brazil 3 Finale.  However, Pierce had to pull out of the fight due to a broken hand.

After over two years away from the sport, Pierce returned from extended hiatus to face Ryan LaFlare on December 11, 2015 at The Ultimate Fighter 22 Finale. He lost the back-and-forth fight by unanimous decision.

On January 29, 2016, Pierce was released from the UFC.

Mixed martial arts record

|-
|Loss
|align=center|17–7
|Ryan LaFlare
|Decision (unanimous)
|The Ultimate Fighter: Team McGregor vs. Team Faber Finale
|
|align=center|3
|align=center|5:00
|Las Vegas, Nevada, United States
|
|-
| Loss
|align=center| 17–6
| Rousimar Palhares
| Submission (heel hook)
| UFC Fight Night: Maia vs. Shields
| 
|align=center| 1
|align=center| 0:31
|Barueri, Brazil
| 
|-
| Win
|align=center| 17–5
| David Mitchell
| TKO (punches)
| UFC 162
| 
|align=center| 2
|align=center| 2:55
|Las Vegas, Nevada, United States
| 
|-
| Win
|align=center| 16–5
| Seth Baczynski
| Decision (unanimous)
| UFC on FX: Sotiropoulos vs. Pearson
| 
|align=center| 3
|align=center| 5:00
|Gold Coast, Australia
| 
|-
| Win
|align=center| 15–5
| Aaron Simpson
| KO (punch)
| UFC on FX: Browne vs. Bigfoot
| 
|align=center| 2
|align=center| 0:29
|Minneapolis, Minnesota, United States
| 
|-
| Win
|align=center| 14–5
| Carlos Eduardo Rocha
| Decision (unanimous)
| UFC on FX: Johnson vs. McCall
| 
|align=center| 3
|align=center| 5:00
|Sunrise, Florida, United States
| 
|-
| Loss
|align=center| 13–5
| Josh Koscheck
| Decision (split)
| UFC 143
| 
|align=center| 3
|align=center| 5:00
|Las Vegas, Nevada, United States
| 
|-
| Win
|align=center| 13–4
| Paul Bradley
| Decision (split)
| UFC on Fox: Velasquez vs. Dos Santos
| 
|align=center| 3
|align=center| 5:00
|Anaheim, California, United States
| 
|-
| Loss
|align=center| 12–4
| Johny Hendricks
| Decision (split)
| UFC 133
| 
|align=center| 3
|align=center| 5:00
|Philadelphia, Pennsylvania, United States
| 
|-
| Win
|align=center| 12–3
| Kenny Robertson
| TKO (punches)
| UFC 126
| 
|align=center| 2
|align=center| 0:29
|Las Vegas, Nevada, United States
| 
|-
| Win
|align=center| 11–3
| Amilcar Alves
| Submission (straight armbar)
| UFC 118
| 
|align=center| 3
|align=center| 3:11
|Boston, Massachusetts, United States
| 
|-
| Win
|align=center| 10–3
| Julio Paulino
| Decision (unanimous)
| UFC Live: Vera vs. Jones
| 
|align=center| 3
|align=center| 5:00
|Broomfield, Colorado, United States
| 
|-
| Loss
|align=center| 9–3
| Jon Fitch
| Decision (unanimous)
| UFC 107
| 
|align=center| 3
|align=center| 5:00
|Memphis, Tennessee, United States
| 
|-
| Win
|align=center| 9–2
| Brock Larson
| Decision (unanimous)
| UFC Fight Night: Diaz vs. Guillard
| 
|align=center| 3
|align=center| 5:00
|Oklahoma City, Oklahoma, United States
| 
|-
| Win
|align=center| 8–2
| Paul Bradley
| Decision (unanimous)
| RIE 2: Brotherly Love Brawl
| 
|align=center| 3
|align=center| 5:00
|Oaks, Pennsylvania, United States
| 
|-
| Win
|align=center| 7–2
| Justin Haskins
| TKO (punches)
| WEC 39
| 
|align=center| 3
|align=center| 3:39
|Corpus Christi, Texas, United States
| 
|-
| Win
|align=center| 6–2
| Sean Huffman
| TKO (punches)
| Carnage at the Creek 4
| 
|align=center| 2
|align=center| 4:40
|Shelton, Washington, United States
| 
|-
| Win
|align=center| 5–2
| Mark Miller
| TKO (doctor stoppage)
| SF 24: Domination
| 
|align=center| 2
|align=center| 1:38
|Portland, Oregon, United States
| 
|-
| Win
|align=center| 4–2
| Jake Paul
| Decision (unanimous)
| EWC: Summer Slaughter
| 
|align=center| 3
|align=center| 5:00
|Salem, Oregon, United States
| 
|-
| Loss
|align=center| 3–2
| Nathan Coy
| Decision (unanimous)
| SF 23: Heated Rivals
| 
|align=center| 5
|align=center| 5:00
|Portland, Oregon, United States
| 
|-
| Win
|align=center| 3–1
| Ed Nuno
| Decision (unanimous)
| SF 21: Seasons Beatings
| 
|align=center| 3
|align=center| 5:00
|Portland, Oregon, United States
| 
|-
| Win
|align=center| 2–1
| Mike Dolce
| KO (slam)
| SF 20: Homecoming
| 
|align=center| 1
|align=center| 0:05
|Portland, Oregon, United States
| 
|-
| Loss
|align=center| 1–1
| Mark Muñoz
| Decision (unanimous)
| GC 69: Bad Intentions
| 
|align=center| 3
|align=center| 5:00
|Sacramento, California, United States
| 
|-
| Win
|align=center| 1–0
| Nick Gilardi
| TKO (doctor stoppage)
| Elite Warriors Championship
| 
|align=center| 2
|align=center| 4:54
|Portland, Oregon, United States
|

See also
 List of current UFC fighters
 List of male mixed martial artists

References

External links
Official UFC Profile

Living people
Sportspeople from Portland, Oregon
American atheists
American male mixed martial artists
Mixed martial artists from Oregon
Welterweight mixed martial artists
Mixed martial artists utilizing collegiate wrestling
1980 births
Ultimate Fighting Championship male fighters
American male sport wrestlers